David Fair (born April 27, 1952) is an American activist who has been a leader in the labor, LGBT, AIDS, homeless and child advocacy movements in Philadelphia, PA since the 1970s. He has founded or co-founded several advocacy and service organizations, including the Philadelphia Lesbian and Gay Task Force (1977), the Philadelphia Gay Cultural Festival (1978), Lavender Health (1979) (now Mazzoni Center), the Philadelphia/Delaware Valley Union of the Homeless (1985), Philly Homes 4 Youth (2017), The Coalition for Queer Equity, and the Philadelphia Coalition on Opioids and Children (2018), and led the creation of numerous local government health and human service initiatives, including the AIDS Activities Coordinating Office for the Philadelphia Department of Public Health (1987) and the Division of Community-Based Prevention Services (2001), the Parenting Collaborative (2003), and the Quality Parenting Initiative (2014) for the Philadelphia Department of Human Services.

Fair has received over 50 community service awards from various Philadelphia agencies and organizations, among them the Philadelphia Inquirer's Citizen Award and the City of Philadelphia Human Rights Award. He was also named among the top 101 Connectors in Philadelphia by Leadership Philadelphia, and has served on over 80 local boards and committees since 1977.

Early life 
Fair was born in Southwest Philadelphia and attended Catholic grade and high schools. He attended the University of Pennsylvania in 1970, where he was active in the anti-Vietnam War movement as well as the local reform Democratic Party movement and later the LGBT rights movement. At Penn he formed and chaired the Penn Voters Rights Council, and won a successful federal lawsuit (Fair v. Osser, 1971), which won Pennsylvania students the right to register to vote from their campus addresses. Also in 1971, he led an effort to organize Penn students to vote against then-Police Commissioner Frank Rizzo in the Philadelphia mayoral race, which was unsuccessful. He also led Penn People for George McGovern in the 1972 Democratic presidential primary in Pennsylvania.

Fair attended Stockholm University in 1974–75 at its Institute for English-Speaking Students in a Penn junior year abroad program. While there, with the help of his then-wife Sonia, he published a newsletter called Rosten (The Voice) for English-speaking students at the university, advocating for a stronger education program and a student voice in curriculum development in the program.

He graduated from Penn with a degree in Political Science in 1975.

The Seventies 
Fair formally “came out" in 1976 at a meeting of a group of gay and bisexual married men held at the nascent Gay Community Center of Philadelphia. He soon became active in several local gay organizations, including Gays at Penn (GAP). In 1977, GAP led a successful effort to force the university to adopt a sexual orientation nondiscrimination policy. Fair, then an administrator at a local Episcopal Church based on campus, along with others, leveraged that activism to organize a group to form a progressive lesbian and gay rights organization, the Philadelphia Lesbian and Gay Task Force (PLGTF), which became the leading LGBT civil rights organization in the region until its dissolution in the mid-2000s. In 1978, Fair also led the effort to put on the first gay and lesbian cultural festival outside of New York and California, called the Philadelphia Gay Cultural Festival, which held over 20 events in 1978 and 1979 including films, theatrical performances, comedy performances, lectures and social events. In the summer of 1979, Fair helped form an LGBT Health Committee of the PLGTF, later organized as the nonprofit Lavender Health. The organization is now named the Mazzoni Center, in honor of physician Peter Mazzoni.

Labor and AIDS Activism 
Along with fellow LGBT Democratic Party activist Scott Wilds and others, Fair formed a 1979 mayoral campaign committee to support pro-LGBT City Councilman Lucien Blackwell, but the campaign was unsuccessful. However, the effort drew the attention of the politically powerful local labor leader Henry Nicholas, president of the local affiliate of 1199: The National Health Care Workers Union, who hired Fair as his executive assistant in 1980. In 1985, Fair was elected the Union's first openly-gay officer, Secretary-Treasurer, and as a Vice President of the Union's national organization. During his tenure at the Union from 1980 to 1988, Fair was the media spokesperson for the union and was involved in numerous strikes and protests, being arrested by Philadelphia police 13 times.

While at 1199C, Fair also became a leading advocate against homelessness in Philadelphia. He was active in the Committee for Dignity and Fairness to the Homeless, Dignity Housing, and other ad hoc groups, and helped to form the Philadelphia/Delaware Valley Union of the Homeless and its chapters in New York and Baltimore. At its height, the National Union of the Homeless had over 15,000 members.

The city's largest social services union at the time, 1199C also became a base for Fair to build bridges between the union's largely black membership and LGBT and AIDS activism. In 1980–82, he and Wilds formed Gay Campaign 80 and the Philadelphia Equal Rights Coalition, successful efforts to elect LGBT people to various neighborhood party posts in the city. The organizing efforts garnered the attention of the Philadelphia Inquirer, which published an article on the growing influence of LGBT political activism in the city featuring Wilds and Fair.

The union hall became a major meeting place for LGBT and progressive organizations, and Fair took advantage of his new connections in the black political networks in which 1199C was prominent to influence black elected officials on LGBT issues. These connections and other organizing efforts by Fair, Wilds, Lisa Bacon, Rita Addessa (head of PLGTF), Doug Bowman and many others were instrumental in the passage of a 1982 amendment to the Philadelphia Fair Practices Act prohibiting discrimination on the basis of sexual orientation. The Union, which itself had a large black LGBT membership, also became the base of Gay and Lesbian Friends of Wilson Goode, chaired by Fair. Goode was elected Philadelphia's first black mayor in 1983

In 1984, Goode appointed Fair to form the city's first Mayor's Commission on Sexual Minorities. Also that year, Fair began years of anti-racist activism within the LGBT community with a speech to the annual dinner of Black and White Men Together Philadelphia, a local multiracial LGBT group which was honoring Fair with a community service award. In that speech, Fair decried the dominance of racist attitudes in the local white gay community, using as a prime example the closing of the only LGBT mental health agency in the city once it began to serve a predominately people of color clientele.

In 1985, as the AIDS epidemic grew in both the LGBT and racial minority communities, Fair encouraged Goode to create the Mayor's Commission on Health Emergencies, the first effort in the city government to create a local response to the AIDS epidemic. That same year, Fair gave the fledgling AIDS prevention organization, Blacks Educating Blacks About Sexual Health Issues (BEBASHI) its first office space.

In 1986, Fair authored AIDS and Minorities in Philadelphia: A Crisis Ignored for BEBASHI and began participating in the organizing of African American and Latino LGBT people to combat the epidemic in their own communities. At the 1986 national convention of the National Association of Black and White Men Together, Fair gave the keynote speech on white gay racism, which was later published in Speaking for Our Lives: Historic Speeches and Rhetoric for Gay and Lesbian Rights 1892-2000. From that point until the mid-1990s, Fair became a leading organizer of anti-racism efforts in the LGBT and HIV/AIDS communities in Philadelphia. These efforts were typified by a speech Fair gave to a town meeting sponsored by the Philadelphia Gay and Lesbian Community Council in 1989 focusing on the need to embrace intersectionality within the community to make progress.

The controversies surrounding the organizing by Fair and other activists, both black and white, among Philadelphia communities of color are detailed in To Make the Wounded Whole: The African American Struggle Against HIV/AIDS a book by Dan Royles at the University of North Carolina.

Fair's efforts resulted in numerous awards, including, in 1989–90, from the AIDS in the Barrio Conference, the Philadelphia Commission on Human Relations, the Philadelphia Fellowship Commission, Unity/Philadelphia, Dignity/Philadelphia, the Philadelphia City Council, and the Mayor's Office. A video produced by Fair, Epidemic: The AIDS Emergency in Philadelphia, won him the Communicator of the Year Award from the Public Relations Society of Southeastern Pennsylvania and the CINE Award for Video Excellence.

In November, 1987, Philadelphia Mayor Goode asked Fair to revitalize the city's lagging HIV/AIDS programs by leading the formation of the AIDS Activities Coordinating Office. Goode provided Fair with a special $6 million ($14 million in 2021 dollars) allocation of unrestricted city funds, leading to the creation of a network of HIV-related services including prevention education, HIV testing and linkage to care, case management, housing, pediatric services, home care, behavioral health and other services. Shortly after his appointment, Fair kicked off the new comprehensive response to the epidemic in Philadelphia with a speech to the Neighborhood Summit on AIDS calling for a recognition that defeating AIDS meant organizing neighborhoods to combat HIV infection among all of those affected, including gay people of color, those fighting addiction, women and others who had historically been ignored by AIDS organizations.

Embroiled in controversy because of his advocacy for more resources to combat the HIV epidemic, Fair led the office until 1990, when he left to lead the city's only advocacy organization composed of people living with HIV, called We The People Living with AIDS/HIV of the Delaware Valley. While at We The People, Fair led efforts to assure equal representation of people living with HIV on HIV/AIDS planning councils and expansion of housing services for homeless people living with HIV/AIDS. He also published a monthly newspaper on HIV/AIDS called Alive & Kicking! along with a weekly update, fastfax.

In 1991, Fair was arrested and injured by Philadelphia police at an ACT-UP demonstration against President George H.W. Bush for his inaction on the AIDS crisis. As a result of a lawsuit filed against the Philadelphia Police Department, Fair received a settlement of $3,000 which he used to purchase the first computer for We The People.

In 1994, he led a 17-day hunger strike with nine others to demand that the state of Pennsylvania maintain funding for the only nursing facility for people with AIDS, Betak, a successful campaign that kept the home open for several more years.

Fair also served as Treasurer of the Philadelphia AIDS Consortium and on the boards of the Chester County AIDS Task Force, Chester County AIDS Support Services, the Montgomery County AIDS Task Force and Philadelphia HIV Mental Health Services during this time. He also helped to form and served on the Board of Directors of The Colours Organization and Unity, Inc., organizations of LGBT people of color, and chaired the AIDS Housing Task Force, co-authoring the 1997 Philadelphia HIV/AIDS Housing Needs Assessment, 1997. Also in 1997, Fair, along with others, published The Time to Act Is Now! Direct HIV Care Services for Philadelphia's African American Community, a comprehensive analysis of the unmet needs of Black Philadelphians for HIV/AIDS services.

Children’s Services and Advocacy 
Fair left We The People in 1996, stating that he was exhausted after 16 years of working in HIV/AIDS services. He was appointed by Philadelphia Health Commissioner Estelle Richman to a position managing a federal grant for a school-based mental health program in nine South Philadelphia schools, which he eventually expanded to over 100 public schools in the Philadelphia School District. In 2000, newly elected Philadelphia Mayor John F. Street appointed him to a newly created position, Director of Community-Based Prevention Services(CBPS), for the Philadelphia Department of Human Services (DHS), which ran the city's child welfare services.  CBPS became a new division within DHS, eventually growing to 85 employees with a budget of $96 million supporting over 200 community-based programs aimed at preventing child abuse, neglect and delinquency. During his tenure, Fair took a leadership role in efforts to reduce Philadelphia's high school dropout rate, co-founding Project U-Turn; started the Parenting Collaborative, the city's first large-scale effort to provide parent education and support services to high-risk families; expanded truancy and delinquency prevention services; and helped create a number of older youth programs, including the Achieving Independence Center (for aging-out foster youth) and the Achieving Reunification Center (for families seeking reunification with their children in foster care). Fair also salvaged with new funding a school-based social work and mental health program that he had started in the late 90s in over 100 public elementary and middle schools, which had run into funding problems.

Fair left DHS in 2005 to become Senior Vice President for Community Impact at United Way of Southeastern Pennsylvania], where he revitalized its 85-year-old  funding strategy to emphasize only organizations “achieving measurable results” focused on the Agenda for Community Solutions, a community investment strategy prioritizing a "return on social investment." While at United Way, Fair played a major role in the establishment of Graduate! Philadelphia, an initiative to help people with some college credits return to get their degree.  The Graduate Network has grown to over 30 sites throughout the United States.  Under the leadership of then-UWSEPA president Alba Martinez and Fair the regional United Way increased its annual fundraising from $49 million to $54 million in just three years.

In 2007, Fair began publishing an online weekly newsletter for United Way called "What Matters," which highlighted news and events of interest to the Philadelphia-area nonprofit community. By 2010, the newsletter had over 15,000 subscribers. After mergers resulted in the new United Way of Greater Philadelphia and Southern New Jersey in 2012, the name of the newsletter was changed to Common Good. Fair remains the editor of the now monthly online publication.

In 2013, after a stint managing David Fair Partners, a consulting firm for nonprofits, Fair became Deputy Chief Executive Officer of Turning Points for Children (TPFC), a small nonprofit family service organization with a budget of $5 million. After Turning Points affiliated with Public Health Management Corporation, Fair led an effort to help the organization compete for contracts with DHS for a new program called Improving Outcomes for Children, which privatized child welfare services in the city, and which eventually led to TPFC obtaining contracts to serve over 2500 families in four of ten regions of the city and increasing the annual TPFC budget to over $62 million. Fair also led the process to establish TPFC's own foster care program, which now is among the city's largest serving almost 700 children. Fair remains a leading advocate for children and families in Philadelphia, especially in the areas of foster care and youth homelessness, where he is a founder of Philly Homes 4 Youth, the Quality Parenting Initiative, and the Philadelphia Coalition on Opioids and Children.

Since 1977, Fair has served on over 80 nonprofit boards and other leadership groups, and in 2022, he serves on eight boards, chairing three of them.

Personal life 
Fair lives in the Germantown section of Philadelphia with his partner since 1997, Rudard Robinson. Once LGBT marriage became legal in Pennsylvania, they were officially married on July 17, 2014, by the Rev. Dr. W. Wilson Goode Sr., the former mayor of Philadelphia.

References

External links
 The Guerrilla Bureaucrat, Philadelphia Inquirer
 Six honored for HIV/AIDS work at Red Ribbon Awards, Philadelphia Gay News
 No longer dying for meds, but dying for housing, Philadelphia Tribune
 WHYY LGBT documentary comes at exactly the right time, Daily Local News
 Philadelphia Coalition on Opioids and Children
 Philly Homes 4 Youth
 Project U-Turn

American LGBT rights activists
HIV/AIDS activists
1952 births
Living people
American health activists
Political activists from Pennsylvania
Activists from Philadelphia
LGBT people from Pennsylvania
University of Pennsylvania alumni
21st-century LGBT people